Studio One is one of Jamaica's most renowned record labels and recording studios; it has been described as the Motown of Jamaica. The record label was involved with most of the major music movements in Jamaica during the 1960s and 1970s, including ska, rocksteady, reggae, dub and dancehall.

History 
Studio One was founded by Clement "Coxsone" Dodd in 1954, and the first recordings were cut in 1963 on Brentford Road in Kingston. Amongst its earliest records were "Easy Snappin" by Theophilus Beckford, backed by Clue J & His Blues Blasters, and "This Man is Back" by trombonist Don Drummond. Dodd had previously issued music on a series of other labels, including World Disc, and had run Sir Coxsone the Downbeat, one of the largest and most reputable sound systems in the Kingston ghettos.

In the early 1960s, the house band providing backing for the vocalists were the Skatalites (1964–65), whose members (including Roland Alphonso, Don Drummond, Tommy McCook, Jackie Mittoo, Lester Sterling and Lloyd Brevett) were recruited from the Kingston jazz scene by Dodd.  The Skatalites split up in 1965 after Drummond was jailed for murder, and Dodd formed new house band the Soul Brothers (1965–66), later named the Soul Vendors (1967) and Sound Dimension (1967-). From 1965 to 1968 they played 9 a.m. to 5 p.m., 5 days a week, 12 rhythms a day (about 60 rhythms a week) with Jackie Mittoo as music director, Brian Atkinson (1965–1968) on bass, Hux Brown on guitar, Harry Haughton (guitar), Joe Isaacs on drums (1966–1968), Denzel Laing on percussion, and on horns (some initially and some throughout): Roland Alphonso, Dennis 'Ska' Campbell, Bobby Ellis, Lester Sterling, among others on horns during the era of Rock Steady. Headley Bennett, Ernest Ranglin, Vin Gordon and Leroy Sibbles were included among a fluid line-up, to record tracks directed by Jackie Mittoo at Studio One from 1966-1968.

During the night hours at Studio One from 1965-1968, singers like Bob Marley, Burning Spear, The Heptones, The Ethiopians, Ken Boothe, Rita Marley, Marcia Griffiths, Judy Mowatt, Alton Ellis, Delroy Wilson, Bunny Wailer and Johnny Nash, among others, would put on headphones to sing lyrics to original tracks recorded by the Soul Brothers earlier each day. These seminal recordings included "Real Rock" (by Sound Dimension), "Heavy Rock", "Jamaica Underground", "Wakie Wakie", "Lemon Tree", "Hot Shot", "I'm Still In Love With You", "Dancing Mood", and "Creation Rebel".

Jackie Mittoo, Joe Isaacs, and Brian Atkinson left Studio One in 1968, recorded drums and bass for Desmond Dekker's and Toots' biggest hits at other Kingston studios, then moved to Canada. Hux Brown stayed in Jamaica to record on the soundtrack The Harder They Come, The Harder They Fall, and toured in Nigeria with Toots and the Maytals and Fela Kuti. The Soul Brothers (a.k.a. Sound Dimension) formed the basis of reggae music in the late 1960s, being versioned and re-versioned time after time over decades by musicians like Shaggy, Sean Paul, Snoop Lion, The Clash, String Cheese Incident, UB40, Sublime, and countless other Billboard originals and remakes trying to emulate their original Rock Steady sound at Coxsone's Studio One.

The label and studio were closed when Dodd relocated to New York City in the 1980s.

Studio One artists 
Studio One has recorded and released music by (and had a large hand in shaping the careers of) artists including:

Noted rival Prince Buster began his career working for Dodd's sound system. In addition, record producer Harry J recorded many of his best-known releases at Studio One.

Reviews 
One online review of "Respect to Studio One" (33 tracks) released by Heartbeat adds "Stax-Volt" to the American R&B comparison and describes Studio One's founder Clement "Coxsone" Dodd as "reggae's Phil Spector, its Berry Gordy, and its Dick Clark all wrapped into one."  The liner notes written by Chris Wilson explain, "It is important to understand why Studio One is so venerated.  The obvious common ingredient in all the classic songs that Studio One has released over the last thirty-five years is Clement Dodd.  From his earliest days as a producer he has understood the complexities of making a hit.  Mr. Dodd values good singing, good songwriting, good horn lines and fierce bass lines...When the band would balk at recording a new artist with an unorthodox style, Mr. Dodd would tell them to bear with him and try it."

See also
 List of record labels
 List of Jamaican record producers

References

External links
 Official website
 Downbeat Special

Jamaican record labels
Recording studios in Jamaica
Record labels established in 1954
Reggae record labels